Mag TV Na! Southern Mindanao (formerly MagTV Na Sadya Ta! and Mag TV Na, Mag Negosyo Ta!) was a weekly entertainment show of ABS-CBN Davao Entertainment Group that airs every Sunday at 9:00am (PST). On October 27, 2013, it is shown as a spin-off show named MAG TV Na, Mag Negosyo Ta!, currently hosted by Onnie Alfaro and Lady Bam, and later reverted to MAG TV Na, similar to the Cebu edition with the same name. This show has been part of Mag TV Na.

Final hosts
 Onnie Alfaro
 Carly Chua (Guest Host)

Past
 Lady Bam Petilos
 Maikee Aportadera (formerly from TV5 Davao, now the Chief of the City Sports Office)
 Eureka Gildo
 Susan "Zansu" Escasinas
 Id Acaylar
 Nadia Shami
 Joey Concepcion
 Glenn Antaran
 Ian Garcia

Final segments
 Onnie 911
 Luwag ni Ian
 MagSuroy Ta!

Defunct
 Dabaw Dyoks Squad
 TipTopTips
 Misyon Makeover

See also
DXAS-TV
Mag TV Na
ABS-CBN Regional Network Group

Television in Davao City
ABS-CBN Regional shows
2008 Philippine television series debuts
2018 Philippine television series endings